Biograph Records is a record label founded in 1967 by Arnold S. Caplin that specialized in early American ragtime, jazz, and blues music. Its reissues includes Bunny Berigan, Bing Crosby, The California Ramblers, Ruth Etting, Benny Goodman, Earl Hines, George Lewis, Ted Lewis, Jimmy O'Bryant, Jabbo Smith, Jack Teagarden, Ethel Waters, and Clarence Williams. The company's label are Melodeon, Center, Regal and Dawn.

In 1970 Biograph bought the rights from QRS Records to release records made from piano rolls, and these included the work of Scott Joplin and Fats Waller. It also bought Melodeon Records and Dawn Records.

In August 2002, Biograph Records was acquired by Retropolis Entertainment, renamed Shout! Factory in 2003, owned by Richard Foos and Robert Emmer, two of the founders. Between 2007 and 2008, Collectables Records reissued forty compact discs' worth of Biograph recordings.

See also 
 List of record labels

References

External links
 Illustrated Biograph Records discography

American record labels
Blues record labels
Jazz record labels
Reissue record labels